Vestey may refer to:

Vestey Group, a group of food production companies
Vestey's Meatworks, slaughterhouse in Darwin, Northern Territory, Australia in operation 1917–1920
Vestey baronets, two British baronetcies

People with the surname
Edmund Hoyle Vestey (1932–2007), English businessman
Sir Edmund Vestey, 1st Baronet (1866–1953), English businessman
Samuel Vestey, 3rd Baron Vestey (1941–2021), English businessman
William Vestey, 1st Baron Vestey (1859–1940), English businessman